Abduraouf Hussain (Arabic:عبد الرؤوف حسين) (born 5 January 1995) is a Qatari footballer who plays as a midfielder.

References

External links
 

Qatari footballers
1995 births
Living people
Al-Sailiya SC players
Al-Gharafa SC players
Lekhwiya SC players
Muaither SC players
Lusail SC players
Qatar Stars League players
Qatari Second Division players
Place of birth missing (living people)
Aspire Academy (Qatar) players
Association football midfielders